Bad Breisig is a town in the district of Ahrweiler, in Rhineland-Palatinate, Germany. It is situated on the Rhine, approx. 15 km south-east of Bad Neuenahr-Ahrweiler.

Bad Breisig is the seat of the Verbandsgemeinde ("collective municipality") Bad Breisig.

Personalities

Sons and daughters of the town
 Beate Berger (1886-1940), director of the Jewish children's home  Beith Ahawah  in Berlin and Haifa

People connected with Bad Breisig
 
 Max Barthel (1893-1975), working poet, lived from 1948 to 1969 in Bad Breisig
 Klaus Badelt (born 1967), a German composer, which specializes in television and soundtrack. 
 The religious scholar and sociologist Oliver Krüger (born 1973) grew up in Bad Breisig.

See also
 Bad Breisig (Final Palaeolithic site)

References

Populated places on the Rhine
Populated places in Ahrweiler (district)
Middle Rhine
Spa towns in Germany